Minyeobong is a mountain of Gyeongsangnam-do, southeastern South Korea. It has an elevation of 930 metres.

See also
List of mountains of Korea

References

Mountains of South Korea
Mountains of South Gyeongsang Province